Seonggeon-dong is an administrative dong or a neighbourhood in the administrative subdivisions of the Gyeongju City, North Gyeongsang province, South Korea. It consists of four legal dongs including Seonggeon-dong and Seokjang-dong. It is bordered by Dongcheon-dong on the east, Geoncheon-eup on the west and Jungbu-dong on the south and Hyeongok-myeon on the north. Its 6.42 square kilometers are home to about 18,219 people. The Gyeongju branch campus of Dongguk University is situated in the district and it has an elementary school and a high school

See also
Subdivisions of Gyeongju
Administrative divisions of South Korea

References

External links
 The official site of the Seonggeon-dong office

Subdivisions of Gyeongju
Neighbourhoods in South Korea